Zora Jandová (born 6 September 1958) is a Czech singer, actress, radio presenter and tai chi practitioner. She studied at the Faculty of Theatre in Prague, graduating in 1982. She acted at the National Theatre in Prague between 1982 and 1985.

Selected filmography 
  (1985)
  (1985)
The Seven Ravens (1993)
Maigret (television, 1996)
  (television, 2008)
  (television, 2008)

External links

References

1958 births
Living people
Actresses from Prague
Czech film actresses
Czechoslovak film actresses
Czechoslovak stage actresses
Czech television actresses
20th-century Czech actresses
21st-century Czech actresses
Tai chi practitioners
Czech radio presenters
Czech women radio presenters